Colin Lockett (born April 5, 1991) is a former American football wide receiver. He played college football at San Diego State University, and went undrafted in the 2014 NFL Draft.

College career

Lockett played collegiately in 48 games with 30 starts at San Diego State University from 2010 to 2013. Lockett redshirted the 2009 season. As a redshirt freshman in 2010, he made his debut against Nicholls State and made his first career tackle against Utah State. He played 11 games, primarily on defense and special teams, collecting seven more tackles. As a sophomore, he appeared in all 13 games, starting 11 of them. He caught 58 passes for 970 yards and eight touchdowns. He led San Diego State in kick returns, averaging 21.9 yards on 31 attempts. Lockett gained 1,744 all-purpose yards, good for second on his team. In his junior season, Lockett played in 12 games and made seven starts. He caught 20 passes for 293 yards and three touchdowns. Of the team's 42 kickoffs during the season, he returned 31 of them, averaging 25.9 yards per return and scoring two of them. As a senior and team captain in 2013, played and started in 12 games and had 52 catches for 736 yards and five touchdowns. He returned 31 kickoffs for 761 yards, and averaged 24.5 per. He was named an Honorable Mention All-Mountain West selection on special teams by coaches and media.

Professional career

Cincinnati Bengals

After going undrafted in the 2014 NFL Draft, the Cincinnati Bengals signed Lockett on May 10, 2014.
On August 30, the Bengals released Lockett with a plan to re-sign him to their practice squad.
On October 14, Cincinnati released Lockett from their practice squad.

Washington Redskins
On December 22, 2014, the Washington Redskins signed Lockett to their practice squad. A week later, he was signed to a futures contract.

On September 5, 2015, the Redskins waived Lockett for final roster cuts before the start of the 2015 season. On October 16, he was once again added to the practice squad to later be cut on October 26. On December 21, Lockett was re-signed to their practice squad.

BC Lions
On March 21, 2016, Colin Lockett and the BC Lions of the Canadian Football League agreed to a contract. He was released by the team on June 12, 2016.

Coaching career
Lockett has coached in the greater Los Angeles area with the private coaching service, CoachUp.

References

External links
 San Diego State bio
 Cincinnati Bengals bio
 Washington Redskins bio

1991 births
Living people
People from Diamond Bar, California
Players of American football from California
American football wide receivers
Canadian football wide receivers
American players of Canadian football
Cincinnati Bengals players
Washington Redskins players
BC Lions players
San Diego State Aztecs football players
Sportspeople from Los Angeles County, California